Shane Anthony Naylor  (born 3 November 1967) is an Australian former athlete who competed in sprinting events during the 1980s and 1990s. Post athletics he has been involved in powerlifting and is a masters world record holder.

Biography
Naylor grew up in the Victorian town of Tatura near Shepparton and has a younger sister Lee who was also a notable sprinter. He was an under-18 national champion in the 100 metres.

A four-time national 100 metres champion, Naylor won his first title in 1987 as a 19-year old. In 1992 he finished sixth in the final of the IAAF World Cup and only narrowly missed the qualifying standard that year for the Olympics in Barcelona. He represented Australia at two Commonwealth Games, including in 1994 when he claimed a silver medal as part of the 4x100 metres relay team. In 1995 he set his personal best of 10.21 seconds at the national championships in Canberra, which qualified him for the World Championships in Gothenburg later that year.

Naylor's nephew Max Holmes plays in the AFL for Geelong.

References

External links
Shane Naylor at World Athletics

1967 births
Living people
Australian male sprinters
Athletes (track and field) at the 1994 Commonwealth Games
Commonwealth Games silver medallists for Australia
Commonwealth Games medallists in athletics
Sportspeople from Victoria (Australia)
Australian powerlifters
World Athletics Championships athletes for Australia
Medallists at the 1994 Commonwealth Games